Spanky and Our Gang was an American 1960s sunshine pop band led by Elaine "Spanky" McFarlane. The band derives its name from Hal Roach's Our Gang comedies of the 1930s (known to modern audiences as The Little Rascals), because of the similarity of McFarlane's surname with that of George McFarland (Spanky). The group was known for its vocal harmonies and had major hits in the US and Canada in 1967–68 with "Sunday Will Never Be the Same," "Lazy Day," "Sunday Mornin'," and "Like to Get to Know You."

History and work

The group's first album was released by Mercury Records on August 1, 1967, with three popular songs that were released as singles. These were "Sunday Will Never Be the Same" (their biggest hit, which reached No. 9 on the U.S. Billboard Hot 100 chart in the summer of 1967), followed by "Making Every Minute Count" (reached No. 31/No. 23 in Canada) and "Lazy Day" (reached No. 14). Both "Sunday Will Never Be The Same" and "Lazy Day" sold over one million copies. "Sunday Will Never Be the Same" was written by Terry Cashman and Gene Pistilli. In an interview of Cashman on the Songfacts website, he revealed that the song was written as a ballad; however, the group "changed it, and they added the vocal, 'Ba-da-da-da-da,' which was a great hook."

Their second album, Like to Get to Know You, was released in April 1968. Two singles were released: "Sunday Mornin'" in the winter, which reached No. 30 on February 10–17, 1968, and "Like to Get to Know You" in the spring, which reached No. 17 on June 8, 1968. The latter single's B-side, "Three Ways From Tomorrow", also received considerable airplay. The album included their rendition of "Stardust", and a version of folksinger Fred Neil's "Everybody's Talkin'", subsequently a hit single for Harry Nilsson and the theme song for the movie Midnight Cowboy.

"Give a Damn" was released as a single in late Summer 1968. Although not receiving airplay in several markets because of the curse word – and because it was a comment on racial equality that became the theme song for the New York Urban Coalition – the song became a regional hit and reached No. 43. The song reached #26 in the Canadian RPM magazine charts.

The band also performed the song live on a November 1968 episode of ABC's The Hollywood Palace, as well as on The Smothers Brothers Comedy Hour that resulted in CBS' Standards and Practices division receiving numerous complaints about the song's title being used during "family viewing hours". One such complaint reportedly came from President Richard Nixon. "Give a Damn" would become John Lindsay's campaign song during his successful run for mayor of New York. 

On October 31, 1968, the group's lead guitarist Malcolm Hale was found dead in his Chicago home, and news reports at the time attributed the death to an attack of bronchial pneumonia.  Almost 39 years later, a 2007 book stated that Hale "died on a Sunday at age twenty-seven from carbon monoxide poisoning due to a bad heating system"  and that account has been repeated in later books. Hale's death was a devastating blow to the group; the multi-instrumentalist did much of the arranging and largely kept the band together. Hale's death, along with the group's satisfaction over what they had achieved already, led to the decision to disband early in 1969. Mercury released a third album, Anything You Choose b/w Without Rhyme or Reason, in January 1969. It contained two popular songs, the previous summer's hit "Give a Damn" and "Yesterday's Rain" (#48 Canada). On August 11, 1971, Lefty Baker died of cirrhosis of the liver, about a year after he left the band. He was 32.  The group briefly reformed in 1975 and recorded an album (Change) for the Epic label.
 

After the band dissolved, McFarlane had some success as a solo artist. In 1975, she had a brief appearance in the film "Moonrunners" as a rough and tumble bartender.  She toured with The New Mamas and the Papas, singing the parts which had been performed by Cass Elliot. She was seen April 2011 on stage in Ferndale Repertory Theatre's production of South Pacific portraying "Bloody Mary".

Later releases
Because of the band's continued popularity, Mercury released album collections of their greatest hits: 1969's Spanky's Greatest Hit(s), 1989's budget Give a Damn and 2005's The Best of Spanky & Our Gang: 20th Century Masters – The Millennium Collection. In addition, Rhino issued the 1986 The Best Of Spanky and Our Gang and Hip-O Select issued a limited-edition anthology of Spanky and Our Gang's Complete Mercury Recordings that includes never-before-released recordings and extensive liner notes.

Members

Discography

Albums
Spanky and Our Gang (Mercury, 1967 – #77)
Like to Get to Know You (Mercury, 1968 – #56)
Anything You Choose b/w Without Rhyme or Reason (Mercury, 1969 – #101)
Spanky's Greatest Hit(s) (Mercury, 1969 – #91) (many songs were given new stereo mixes, and on the first CD reissue, the additional overdubs were removed)
Spanky & Our Gang Live (Mercury, 1970, recorded in 1967)
Change (Epic, 1975)
The Best of Spanky & Our Gang (Rhino, 1986)
The Best of Spanky & Our Gang: 20th Century Masters – The Millennium Collection (Mercury, 2005)
The Complete Mercury Recordings (Hip-O Select, 2006) (4 discs, limited edition of 5000 (un-numbered))
Greatest Hits (Mercury, 2007)
Back Home Americana (Spectra, 2010)
The Singles and More (Crash, 2013)
The Complete Mercury Singles (Real Gone Music, 2014) – 4th disc from the Hip-O 4-CD set

Singles

References

External links
Official website

Rock music groups from Illinois
American folk rock groups
Mercury Records artists
Musical groups disestablished in 1969
People from Ferndale, California
Sunshine pop
Female-fronted musical groups